Midgard is the Earth in Norse mythology.

Midgard may also refer to:
Midgard (software), an open-source content management system
Midgard (hardware), Midgard architecture for embedded GPUs
Midgard (album), a 2016 album by Faun
Midgard (game), a play-by-mail game
Midgard (role-playing game), a German role-playing game
Midgard, Scotland, a location in the United Kingdom
Midgard, a German fantasy novel by Wolfgang Hohlbein
"Midgård", a song released by the band Therion, originally on the Secret of the Runes album
Midgard, one of the three realms in the MMORPG Dark Age of Camelot
Midgard I, a sailing ship later renamed Midgard IV and Dorothea Weber
Midgard Glacier, Greenland
Midgard Mountain, a mountain in Nunavut, Canada
Midgard Peak, in British Columbia, Canada

See also
Midgaard (Marquette, Michigan), a historic site
Midgar, a city in the video game Final Fantasy VII